Idalécio Silvestre Lopes Soares Rosa, known as Idalécio (born 27 September 1973) is a former Portuguese football player.

He played 11 seasons and 242 games in the Primeira Liga, mostly for Braga and Rio Ave and also for Nacional and Farense.

Club career
He made his professional debut in the Primeira Liga for Farense on 19 August 1995 as a starter in a 2–1 victory over Tirsense.

References

1973 births
People from Loulé
Living people
Portuguese footballers
Louletano D.C. players
S.C. Farense players
Primeira Liga players
S.C. Braga players
C.D. Nacional players
Rio Ave F.C. players
C.D. Trofense players
Liga Portugal 2 players
Gondomar S.C. players
Association football defenders
Sportspeople from Faro District